Margaret Kathleen  Maddocks (née Cooper; 10 August 1906 – 20 October 1993) was a British writer of 17 gothic and romance novels.  Before retiring she wrote her autobiography: An Unlessoned Girl in 1977. She is the only novelist to win four Romantic Novel of the Year Award by the Romantic Novelists' Association.

Biography

Personal life
Born in Caversham, Oxfordshire (now Berkshire), Maddocks was educated at St. Helen's School, Northwood, London, Middlesex, and in Dresden, Staffordshire. On 1937, she married Richard Maddocks, who died in 1970. She died in October 1993.

Career
Published since 1947 under her married name, Margaret Maddocks, she is the only novelist who has won four Romantic Novel of the Year Award by the Romantic Novelists' Association for her novels Larksbrook (1962), The Silver Answer (1965), Thea (1970), and The Moon is Square (1976).

In 1977, before retiring she published her autobiography: An Unlessoned Girl.

Bibliography

Novels
 Come Lasses and Lads (1944)
 The Quiet House (1947)
 Remembered Spring (1949)
 Fair Shines the Day (1952) aka The Open Door
 Piper's Tune (1954)
 A Summer Gone (1957)
 The Frozen Fountain (1959)
 Larksbrook (1962)
 The Green Grass (1963)
 November Tree (1964)
 The Silver Answer (1965)
 Dance Barefoot (1966)
 Fool's Enchantment (1968)
 Thea (1969)
 The Weathercock (1971)
 A View of the Sea (1973)
 The Moon is Square (1975)

Autobiography
 An Unlessoned Girl (1977)

References and sources

1906 births
1993 deaths
People from Caversham, Reading
English romantic fiction writers
English autobiographers
RoNA Award winners
20th-century English novelists
20th-century English women writers
Women romantic fiction writers
English women novelists
English women non-fiction writers
Women autobiographers